Paul Loup Karl Sulitzer (born 22 July 1946, in Boulogne-Billancourt) is a French financier and author. Before he turned seventeen, he was already a self-made millionaire. Sulitzer used his financial experience and knowledge in his books, which often related to the business world.

Many of his books were ghost-written by Loup Durand.

Biography
Sulitzer's father was a Jewish immigrant from Romania who died when Sulitzer was 10. Six years later Sulitzer joined a trading company that operated in the Middle East. According to his editor, he became the youngest CEO in France at age 21 and made his fortune selling gadgets (notably keychains that were very popular between the years 1960 and 1970 ) in the UK that he imported from the Far East. In 1968 he incorporated a holding company and established a financial consultant firm.

In 1980 Sulitzer proposed to Danoël the production of a "western finance" that would be a novel of finance-fiction adventures. Loup Durand, a journalist and writer, did the writing. The book Money reached a large audience. This would be followed by Cash! (1981) and Fortune (1982) which depicted the exploits and financial dreams of Franz Cimballi, a vigilante businessman.

After these thrillers of a new genre, the duo published Le Roi Vert (1983). It was a romantic saga that achieved considerable public success and was translated into 30 languages.

At the end of the 1980s, he was a lecturer, with François Spoerry, Jean-Pierre Thiollet and others, to an international meeting in Geneva of Amiic (World Real Estate Investment Organization).

In 2000, he was arrested, along with the son of the former socialist president Mitterrand, for the illegal sale of weapons to Angola.

Bibliography

Novels

Comics

During the early nineties, three of his novels were adapted into comics. The adaptions,  in 12 volumes, were written by Jean Annestay, drawn by multiple artists and published between 1991 and 1995 by French comics publisher Dupuis.

The Green King was adapted into a comic series from 1991 to 1995. The artist on the first issue, Jacques Armand, died April 17, 1991 before it was completed. His friends, Alexandre Coutelis, Christian Rossi and Gilles Mezzomo helped complete the album.
Le Roi Vert – Le Traque (English: The Green King – The Revenge) (by Armand and Annestay) (1991)
Le Roi Vert – Guaharibos (English: The Green King – Guaharibos) (by Mezzomo and Annestay) (1993)
Le Roi Vert – Les Chiens Noirs (English: The Green King – The Black Dogs) (by Mezzomo and Annestay) (1994)
Le Roi Vert – Charmian Page (English: The Green King – Charmian Page) (by Mezzomo and Annestay) (1994)
Le Roi Vert – Le Royaume (English: The Green King – The Kingdom) (by Mezzomo and Annestay) (1995)

Rourke was adapted into a comic series from 1991 to 1994.
01 – "La Mort Est Toujours Bonne" by Marvano
02 – "Le Bon Dieu Ne Dort Jamaims" by Marvano and Rouffa
03 – "Le Trois Concubine" by Marvano et Rouffa
04 – "Tigre d'Avril" by Marvano et Rouffa

Hannah was adapted in three volumes from 1991 to 1993, drawn by Franz Drappier.

Honors and awards
1981 : Prize for the Book of the Summer for Cash! (Denoël, 1981)
1987 : Medal of Vermeil of the City of Paris
1987 : Knight of the National Order of Merit (later excluded by a decree published in the official journal on 28 November 2012)
1996 : Officier de l'Ordre national du Mérite (later excluded by a decree published in the official journal on 28 November 2012)
Knight of Cahors
Citizen of Honor of the Liège

Legal affairs
In October 2008 the Angolagate trial commenced in Paris, in which Sulitzer was indicted. By the decision of the Correctional Tribunal he was condemned for "misuse of corporate assets" and given 15 months in prison with a fine of 100,000 euros. This conviction led to his exclusion from the National Order of Merit in November 2012. In 2009 he published Angolagate, the chronicle of a state scandal, which had been written day by day during the process, from October 2008 to March 2009.

References

External links
Paul-Loup Sulitzer. Ecrivain et financier français
The New York Times

1946 births
Living people
People from Boulogne-Billancourt
20th-century French novelists
French financiers
French male novelists
French people of Romanian-Jewish descent
20th-century French male writers